The British Co-Ed High School is a private high school in Patiala, Punjab, India. It is affiliated to the ICSE board of education. It is a day school founded in 2002 by Mrs. Rosa A. Kucharskyj. She is also currently the Principal of this school. The school prepares students for the Indian Certificate of Secondary Education (Class X) and the Indian School Certificate (Class XII) Examinations.

Overview
The British Co-Ed High School is a progressive, child centered day school with a strong emphasis on the holistic development of the student.

The school is a Registered Society with the Governing Body affiliated to The Council for the Indian School Certificate Examination. In 2008 Permanent Affiliation was granted plus permission to hold classes (10+2) known as ISC –the Indian School Certificate.

Houses
There are three houses in this school:

Tagore

Named after Rabindranath Tagore, an Indian Noble Laureate

Teresa

Named after Mother Teresa

Tolstoy

Owes its genesis to the famous socialist writer Leo Tolstoy

References

External links
 The British Co-Ed High School Website 

High schools and secondary schools in Punjab, India